Radivoje Ristanović (born 2 December 1982) is a Serbian-Montenegrin handball player for Croatian club Zagreb and the Montenegro national team.

Club career
During his journeyman career, Ristanović played in Serbia (Partizan and Vojvodina), Montenegro (Lovćen), Spain (Teucro, Ademar León, and San Antonio), Qatar (Al Ahli Doha), Germany (HBW Balingen-Weilstetten), France (Chambéry), Hungary (Balatonfüredi KSE), Israel (Maccabi Rishon LeZion), and Croatia (Zagreb).

International career
Ristanović was capped for the Serbia national B team, before accepting a call-up to represent Montenegro in 2015. He participated at the 2016 European Championship.

Honours
Partizan
 Handball Championship of FR Yugoslavia: 2001–02, 2002–03
Lovćen
 Montenegrin Men's Handball First League: 2006–07
Zagreb
 Croatian Handball Premier League: 2018–19
 Croatian Handball Cup: 2018–19

References

External links
 SEHA record
 MKSZ record
 

1982 births
Living people
Handball players from Belgrade
Serbian people of Montenegrin descent
Montenegrin people of Serbian descent
Serbian male handball players
Montenegrin male handball players
RK Partizan players
RK Vojvodina players
CB Ademar León players
SDC San Antonio players
RK Zagreb players
Liga ASOBAL players
Handball-Bundesliga players
Expatriate handball players
Serbian expatriate sportspeople in Spain
Serbian expatriate sportspeople in Qatar
Montenegrin expatriate sportspeople in Germany
Montenegrin expatriate sportspeople in France
Montenegrin expatriate sportspeople in Hungary
Montenegrin expatriate sportspeople in Israel
Montenegrin expatriate sportspeople in Croatia